Scythia was an ancient kingdom founded by the Scythians in antiquity.

Scythia may also refer to:
 Scythia, the name of various regions inhabited by the Scythians
 Scythia (band), a Canadian folk/metal band
 1306 Scythia, an asteroid 
 Iškuza, 7th-century Scythia in West Asia 
 RMS Scythia (1920–1958), a Cunard liner

See also
 Scythia Minor (disambiguation)
 Scythian (disambiguation)
 Scythe (disambiguation)